Cerioni is an Italian surname that may refer to
Alberto Cerioni (1919–1948), Argentine football player
Mauro Cerioni (born 1948), Italian basketball player
Rubí Cerioni (1927–2012), Argentine football player
Stefano Cerioni (born 1964), Italian foil fencer

Italian-language surnames